Maharorh is a village in Rohtas district, Bihar state, India. Maharorh is a gram panchayat. The language spoken in Maharorh is Bhojpuri. Agriculture is the main occupation.

Overview
There is one government school up to class eight. There is one post office and a branch of Bank of India. This village is famous for Brinjal (eggplant), Tomato & Peppermint production in Bihar.

Transport
This village is well connected with road to Dehri and Sasaram, and has a big railway station with almost all the major trains stopping there. Sasaram is well connected with Ara by rail as well as road.

Villages in Rohtas district